"Obstacle 1" is a song by American rock band Interpol. It was released as the second single from their debut studio album, Turn on the Bright Lights, on November 11, 2002. It was eventually remixed by producer Arthur Baker and reissued as a single on September 15, 2003. The music video for "Obstacle 1" was directed by Floria Sigismondi. The song peaked at number 41 on the UK Singles Chart and was also ranked at number 64 on Pitchforks 'Top 500 Tracks of the Decade' list.

"Obstacle 1" is featured as a playable track on Guitar Hero World Tour. Singer Charlotte Martin has a rendition of "Obstacle 1" on her album, Reproductions. The song was also used to highlight Adam Sandler for Best Comedic Performance at the 2003 MTV Movie Awards for his work in Mr. Deeds.

Music video
The promotional video for the song was directed by Floria Sigismondi.
It shows several shots of the band playing in an aisle, there are many wires moving up and down.
Then, a woman (Sigismondi herself) appears dancing the song on another aisle. In a shot, a glass of water fall down and breaks, the water begins to move through the aisles and arrives to the aisle where the woman is dancing. The woman falls down and is electrocuted as a result of the electrical wires in the water.

Track listing

2002 single
CD (OLE570-2):
 "Obstacle 1" – 4:11
 "PDA" (Live KCRW Morning Becomes Eclectic Session) – 4:56
 "Hands Away" (Live Peel Session) – 3:10

7" vinyl (OLE570-7):
 "Obstacle 1" – 4:11
 "Obstacle 2" (Live Peel Session) – 3:50

2003 single
Remix CD (OLE594-2):
 "Obstacle 1" (Arthur Baker Remix Edit) – 4:17
 "Obstacle 1" (Arthur Baker Remix Long Version) – 5:55
 "Obstacle 1" (Radio Edit) – 3:36

7" vinyl (OLE594-7):
 "Obstacle 1" (Arthur Baker Remix Edit) – 4:17
 "Obstacle 1" (Live Black Session) – 4:18

DVD (OLE594-9):
 "Obstacle 1" (video) – 3:47
 "Specialist" (Live Black Session) (audio) – 6:34
 "Leif Erikson" (Live Black Session) (audio) – 3:55

Chart performance

References

2002 singles
Interpol (band) songs
Song recordings produced by Gareth Jones
Music videos directed by Floria Sigismondi
Matador Records singles
Songs about suicide
2002 songs
Songs written by Carlos Dengler
Songs written by Paul Banks (American musician)
Songs written by Sam Fogarino
Songs written by Daniel Kessler (guitarist)